Old Toby (died 1858), whose name was Pikee Queenah (Swooping Eagle), was war chief of the Tuziyammo (Big Lodge) band of Western Shoshone and a Shoshone dog soldier.

Guide
He served as a guide for the later part of Lewis and Clark Expedition in 1805, as did Tetoharsky and Twisted Hair. He guided Clark's exploration of the Salmon River and led the entire party from the Lemhi River Valley at Salmon, Idaho, over the Bitterroot Mountains to the Bitterroot Valley, and then over the Lolo Trail to the Clearwater River country above Lewiston, Idaho.

He left the expedition and returned home. Nez Perce Indians relayed that he stole horses and returned home. He died of typhoid in 1858.

Name
Thomas Rees' journal gives his name as Tobe, an abbreviation of Tosa-tive koo-be, meaning "furnished white white-man brains," referring to his work as their guide. He was simply called Toby, but the moniker "Old Toby" was added later in popular literature.

Legacy
A monument was erected is his honor in the 1930s but demolished during construction of US Highway 93. A new monument was erected in his honor in North Fork, Idaho, near Highway 93 and the Salmon River Road in 2009.

References

Year of birth missing
1858 deaths
Lewis and Clark Expedition people
Western Shoshone people